Hargeisa Water Agency  is the governmental agency responsible for water supply to the Somaliland capital city of Hargeisa. It was formed in 1974,
And the current manager of the agency is Mohamed Ali Darod

See also

Ministry of Water Resources (Somaliland)
Hargeisa Airport
Hargeisa Stadium
Hargeisa Group Hospital
University of Hargeisa

References

External links
 Official Website of Hargeisa Water Agency

Hargeisa
Politics of Somaliland